Cress Spring is a spring that lies in Floyd County, in the U.S. state of Georgia.

Cress Spring was found for the watercress found there.

References

Bodies of water of Floyd County, Georgia
Springs of Georgia (U.S. state)